Roman Lešek (born 7 August 1937 in Celje) is a Slovenian former pole vaulter who competed in the 1960 Summer Olympics and in the 1964 Summer Olympics.

References

1937 births
Living people
Slovenian male pole vaulters
Yugoslav male pole vaulters
Olympic athletes of Yugoslavia
Athletes (track and field) at the 1960 Summer Olympics
Athletes (track and field) at the 1964 Summer Olympics
Sportspeople from Celje
Mediterranean Games gold medalists for Yugoslavia
Mediterranean Games medalists in athletics
Athletes (track and field) at the 1963 Mediterranean Games